Keylee Sue Sanders (born July 29, 1977) is an American beauty queen who was Miss Kansas Teen USA and Miss Teen USA 1995.

Sanders first won the Miss Kansas Teen USA title in October 1994.  In August 1995 she was crowned Miss Teen USA in the national pageant televised live from Wichita, in her home state of Kansas.  As Miss Kansas Teen USA, Sanders was part of the Vanbros organization, and she would retain links with that group after she gave up her crown.

Sanders later graduated from Kansas State University with a Bachelor of Science degree in Fashion merchandising.  She remained involved in pageantry, and formed her own pageant consulting business, Keylee Sue & Associates, Inc, in 1997.  In 1999, Sanders designed the competition gowns for Miss Kansas Teen USA and Miss Missouri Teen USA.

Sanders moved to Los Angeles, California, where she worked in the television industry for a while, appearing on Good Day Live, Soap Talk and in a Smash Mouth video.  She continues to appear as an on-air fashion expert and on-air host for Good Day LA and Good Day Live. She also continues to model and work in commercials.

Sanders joined with Keith Lewis, director of the Morgan Agency to form K2 Productions, and this company took over the directorship of the Miss California USA and Miss California Teen USA pageants in 2006.

In 2016, she was one of the judges at the Miss Teen USA 2016 pageant, in The Venetian Theatre, Las Vegas, Nevada.

References

Living people
1970s births
Miss Teen USA winners
Miss USA state directors
People from Louisburg, Kansas
1995 beauty pageant contestants
20th-century Miss Teen USA delegates
20th-century American people